Knut Holmqvist (15 July 1918 – 28 August 2000) was a Swedish sport shooter. He competed in trap shooting at the 1952 and 1956 Olympics and finished in second and seventh place, respectively. He won a team gold and an individual bronze medal at the 1952 World Championships.

References

1918 births
2000 deaths
Swedish male sport shooters
Shooters at the 1952 Summer Olympics
Shooters at the 1956 Summer Olympics
Olympic shooters of Sweden
Olympic silver medalists for Sweden
Olympic medalists in shooting
Medalists at the 1952 Summer Olympics
20th-century Swedish people
21st-century Swedish people